New Khmer Architecture was coined by authors Helen Grant Ross and Darryl Leon Collins to describe an architectural movement in Cambodia during the 1950s and 1960s. The style blended elements of the Modern Movement with two distinctly Cambodian traditions: the grand tradition of Angkor, and the vernacular tradition of domestic buildings. 
The Kingdom of Cambodia gained independence from France in 1953.  Winning the elections in 1955, Prince Norodom Sihanouk founded the Sangkum Reastr Niyum, a political experiment in economic development that went hand in hand with the arts in general, and this innovative architecture in particular.  It reached its apotheosis in the 1960s and came abruptly to an end in 1970 with the overthrow of Norodom Sihanouk by Gen. Lon Nol.

Historic overview

The driving force behind the movement was Norodom Sihanouk, King (1953–1955), Prime Minister (1955–1960), Head of State (1960–1970), visionary leader much beloved by his people, composer, writer, poet and lyricist, filmmaker, interior designer, and patron of the arts. Starting in 1953, year of Cambodia's independence, his vision of Cambodia as a modern, developed country and an integral part of the world led him to drive an all-encompassing effort to modernize the country, from agriculture to infrastructure and industry, education to health care, tourism to the arts.
At first the foreign influences in the style were clear, but quickly the architects of the movement, many of them trained abroad, become more confident in their use of distinctly Cambodian elements, merging them seamlessly with Modern elements.
During the 1960s Phnom Penh with its many buildings in the style of New Khmer Architecture, was called the 'Pearl of the East'. During a visit to the city in the 1960s, Lee Kuan Yew,  Prime Minister of the Republic of Singapore from 1959 to 1990, was so impressed he expressed his desire for Singapore to develop along similar lines.
The movement came abruptly to an end in 1970 with the US-backed overthrow of Norodom Sihanouk by Gen. Lon Nol.

Present and future

Although the East of Cambodia was badly hit by American bombing with towns such as Kampong Cham and Kampot including their universities and hospitals being razed, many New Khmer Architecture buildings in Phnom Penh and across the country survived the years of war and devastation remarkably intact. 
Unfortunately ruthless liberalism and the current period of high economic growth are proving to be a much greater threat. The magnificent Preah Suramarit National Theatre, which partially burned down in 1994 after welding repairs accidentally set fire to the roof and the Council of Ministers, have already been destroyed in the speculative rush to cash in on the rise in the value of land. Not just buildings of the 1950s and 1960s, but also buildings from the colonial period are threatened. Many buildings built during the period are in poor shape. The National Sports Complex is especially vulnerable. Even though it is still in regular use, a recent "renovation" was extremely superficial. The moats surrounding the stadium, integral part of the design for flood prevention, have been or are being filled with shoddy new constructions. Of the two apartment blocks on the Front de Bassac, the so-called 'White Building' was demolished in 2015; the other has been encapsulated in concrete and has lost all its distinct features. Only a few buildings in the style are in good condition and regularly used; the Chamkarmon Compound (part of the Senate), Chaktomuk Conference Hall and Chenla Theatre, for example.
Confounding the situation is the fact that many Cambodians, especially those in power, do not recognize the cultural value of this architecture. On the contrary, many – erroneously – see it as something foreign, because "it's too modern (...) and is not understood as being an expression of a vital time in Cambodia's history". Currently there are a small group of people, mainly foreigners, who are trying to raise awareness in an effort to save the remaining sites. A new generation of Cambodian architecture students are also aware of the situation.

Characteristics of the style
There are several typical elements that characterize the style.

From the Modern movement comes the use of reinforced concrete and assertive structures.

Elements of vernacular tradition can be seen in the adaptations to the local tropical climate. Traditional Cambodian houses are usually raised on columns. This makes for an open, shaded space for social activities, creates a natural cooling effect, and the height of the building offers protection in times of floods. New Khmer Architecture often uses this approach. Other adaptations to the climate are the use of wall panels, double walls and roofs (especially the typical VVV- shaped roofs that can be found many of the buildings in the style) to prevent direct sunlight. Loggias (covered balconies and walkways) and claustras (decorative openwork) offer shade. Particular attention was often paid to the creation of natural ventilation to cool the building. Traditional houses also have an open floor plan, another theme that can be found in many New Khmer Architecture buildings. Many of them are light, white (another adaptation to climate) and open. And just like in traditional houses the building's structure is clear, in New Khmer Architecture buildings the structure is not hidden. On the contrary, it is often used as an integral part of the look of a building and forms a decorative element.

Many buildings are infused with Cambodian culture and everyday life. Sometimes elements of traditional temples are used, like multi-tiered tiled roofs, golden spires, tympani (gables) and roof ornaments. Sometimes a traditional object formed an inspiration for a design. Vann Molyvann's library at the Teacher Training College looks like a traditional straw hat. The Chaktomuk Conference Hall, also by Vann Molyvann, offers another example of the use of traditional objects as inspiration, with its fan shaped roof and golden spire.

The Angkor tradition suggested the use of moats and raised walkways. Moats are not only decorative, but also function as a water reservoir in rainy season, and work as a cooling device. The National Sports Complex and the Teacher Training College (now Institute of Foreign Languages) are prime examples of this approach.

Late colonial architecture, especially buildings such as the Central Market and Phnom Penh Railway Station, had an influence in the innovative use of reinforced concrete.

Government buildings, state residences, factories, schools and universities, health centers and hospitals, sports complexes, exhibition halls, cinemas and theaters, airports and train stations, churches, private houses and social housing projects, even stupas and monuments were built in the style. Although the most impressive examples can be found in Phnom Penh, the country's provincial capitals and other towns benefitted from the national effort to modernize the whole country.
Most projects were funded from the national budget or private Cambodian funds, because as Sihanouk declared 'I do not want to indebt my children'.  International technical assistance was accepted from the UN and foreign governments, such as the United States of America, the USSR, and China. Two UN experts, Vladimir Bodiansky and Gerald Hanning, provided valuable technical support in the early 1960s to the point that Vann Molyvann said they were his masters. Gerald Hanning who had participated in the Modulor, Le Corbusier's famous tool for proportion, initiated Vann Molyvann to it.  After that he used it in all his designs.

Important architects
When Cambodia gained independence from France there was not a single qualified Cambodian architect or engineer in the whole ex-colony.  Gradually young qualified architects returned from abroad. Totally lacking in experience, they were promptly loaded with the most taxing work-load. In the meantime technical and engineering schools started training engineers and technicians. But it was not until 1965 that architecture began to be taught at the newly founded Royal University of Fine Arts of which the most famous New Khmer Architect Vann Molyvann was given the job of Rector. Other Cambodian architects who played an important role were Lu Ban Hap, Chhim Sun Fong, Seng Suntheng, Ung Krapum Phka and Mam Sophana. Many of them trained abroad, especially in France or the United States. Altogether Grant Ross and Collins (opus cit pp72) identified over 60 architects from many different origins who contributed to the work of the Sangkum Reastr Niyum: Henri Chatel, Jamshed Petigura, Leroy & Mondet, Claude Bach, to mention a few. The architects for the Khmer-Soviet Friendship Hospital in Phnom Penh were Russian; Gordienko and Erchov.  In recent years the important contribution of Japanese experts and contractors, has come to light, of whom Gyoji Banshoya, Nobuo Goto and Setsuo Okada have been documented by Kosuke Matsubara.  Dr Lynn Emerson was the American architect who designed the School of Applied Arts and Engineering.  All this goes to show how the Head of State harnessed all the intellectual forces available.  Backed up by the ever enthusiastic Prince Norodom, the diverse origins of these highly qualified technicians contributed to the creative mood.
Not an architect as such, Prince Sihanouk was the driving force behind the movement. He personally supervised most projects and encouraged his architects to reach their highest possible level of achievement. He also worked as an interior designer on some buildings and reviewed all the plans before approval.

Important buildings

Phnom Penh
 Bassac Riverfront: Municipal Apartments, Lu Ban Hap with Vladimir Bodiansky, c. 1963, demolished 2015
 Bassac Riverfront: National Bank Apartments (now part of the Russian Embassy), Henri Chatel and Jamshed Petrigura, c. 1963
 Bassac Riverfront: Olympic Village Apartments, Vann Molyvann, c. 1963
 Bassac Riverfront: Preah Suramarit National Theater, Vann Molyvann, 1968, demolished 2008
 Bassac Riverfront: Sangkum Reastr Exhibition Hall, Vann Molyvann, 1961
 Hotel Cambodiana, Chhim Sun Fong, Lu Ban Hap, Norodom Sihanouk (interior design), 1969
 Chaktomuk Conference Hall, Vann Molyvann, 1961
 Chamkarmon Compound, Lu Ban Hap, Vann Molyvann and others, 1950s-1960s
 Chenla State Cinema (now Chenla Theater), Lu Ban Hap with Chhim Sun Fong, 1969
 Council of Ministers, Vann Molyvann and Grimeret, 1950s, demolished 2008
 Independence Monument, Vann Molyvann and Ing Kieth, 1962
 Institute of Technology, Russian architects, 1964
 Khmer-Soviet Hospital, Gordienko and Erchov, 1964
 Milk factory (now Kingdom Breweries), Uk Sameth, 1970
 National Sports Complex, Vann Molyvann, Um Samuth, Gérald Hanning, Vladimir Bodiansky, Claude Duchemin, Jean-Claude Morin, 1964
 Royal University of Phnom Penh, Leroy & Mondet, 1968
 State Palace (now Senate), Vann Molyvann, 1966
 Teacher Training College (now Institute of Foreign Languages), Vann Molyvann, 1972

Battambang
 Battambang University, Ung Krapum Phka, 1968

Sihanoukville
 St. Michael's Church, Sihanoukville, 1965, A. Ahadoberry & Vann Molyvann
 Independence Hotel, Leroy & Mondet, 1968
 SKD Brewery and staff housing, Vann Molyvann, 1968
 National Bank of Cambodia and staff housing, Vann Molyvann, 1968

References

 Grant Ross, Helen and Collins, Darryl Leon Building Cambodia: 'New Khmer Architecture' 1953-1970, Bangkok: The Key Publisher Co. Ltd., 2006 
(Chapter 4 Modern Traditional "What was so unique about New Khmer Architecture?" pp101-138 Offers a complete overview of the New Khmer Architecture movement and style, its history and evolution, and its most important buildings and architects.)

Architecture in Cambodia
Architectural styles